Southampton is a community in the Canadian province of Nova Scotia, located in  Cumberland County . It has two roads leading up to it, Route 2 and Route 302. In Southampton, Nova Scotia there is the Elizabeth House General Store, which opened in 1923.

References
Southampton on Destination Nova Scotia

Communities in Cumberland County, Nova Scotia
General Service Areas in Nova Scotia